Hong Kong Tramways (HKT) is a  narrow-gauge tram system in Hong Kong. Owned and operated by RATP Dev Transdev Asia, the tramway runs on Hong Kong Island between Kennedy Town and Shau Kei Wan, with a branch circulating through Happy Valley.

Hong Kong's tram system is one of the earliest forms of public transport in the metropolis, having opened in 1904 under British rule. It has used electric trams since its inauguration, and has never used horse or steam power. It owns the world's largest operational double-decker tram fleet, and is a very rare example of a tram system that uses them exclusively. In addition to being used by commuters, the system is popular with tourists, and is one of the most environmentally friendly ways of travelling in the city.

History

Timeline

1881: Tramway system proposed for Hong Kong.
1882: The Hong Kong Government published the Professional Tramways Ordinance. However, the focus was on the Peak Tram, which was of more interest to the government and business interests that largely resided on Victoria Peak. As a result, there was little interest in developing the tram network along Hong Kong Island, so the policy was deferred.
1883–1888: There was an increase in the population between 1883 and 1888, from 173,475 to 215,800. The government hoped the tram system would give quick access to all areas of Victoria and reduce dependence on the chair coolies.
1901: The government started to revise its tramway policy. Tramway system proposal accepted by the government.
1902: Hong Kong Tramway Electric Company Limited founded in London. Name changed to Electric Traction Company of Hong Kong Limited.
1903: Construction of a single-track system began from Kennedy Town to Causeway Bay; it was later extended to Shau Kei Wan.
1904: Bodies of first fleet of 26 UK-built tramcars shipped in pieces to Hung Hom to be assembled. First-class compartments were enclosed in the centre and had two long benches on both sides, with both the front and back ends open. Seating capacity was 32 passengers. The third-class tramcars were open-sided, with six sets of benches running crossways back-to-back, seating 48 passengers. Fares for first and third class were ten cents and five cents respectively. The trams were initially going to be divided into three classes, but subsequently only first and third class were chosen for ease of operation.
1910: Company name changed to The Hong Kong Tramway Company Limited.
1912: First double-decker tramcar introduced in 1912 due to strong passenger demand. The tramcar had an open-balcony design, fitted with garden-type seats. The first class occupied the upper deck and one-third of the lower deck. Ten new tramcars constructed.
1922: Electricity contracted and supplied by Hong Kong Electric Company. Company name changed to Hong Kong Tramways Limited (HKT).
1925: Enclosed double-decker trams replaced open-balcony trams.
1932: North Point Depot came into service.
1934: Refuge islands began to be introduced at some busy tram stops to increase passenger safety. 
1941: Japanese occupation begins. Very limited service was provided; only 12 tramcars were in operation daily from Causeway Bay to Sheung Wan. One single-decker tram was used for freight transport.
1945: After three years and eight months of Japanese occupation, all 109 tramcars remained, but only 15 were operational. By October 1945, 40 tramcars were back in service.
1949: Single-track system replaced by double-track system in August.
1950: HKT undertook an extensive redesign and started building its own trams. Tram bodies adopted a "modern" design.
1954: North Point Depot closed and Russell Street Depot expanded and renamed Sharp Street East Depot.
1964: Three locally made trams added, including the first single-deck trailer.
1965: 10 single-deck trailers introduced. Trailers were attached to the backs of tramcars and designed to serve first class passengers only. Seating capacity was 36 passengers.
1966: 22 single-deck trailers deployed during 1966–67. Trailers were withdrawn from service by 1982 due to frequent derailments and being uneconomical to run; they each required a separate conductor.
1967: Last trailer built by HKT.
1972: Class distinction abolished and flat fare introduced.
1974: HKT acquired by The Wharf (Holdings)
1976: Coin fareboxes installed at each tram front exit, and rotating turnstiles fitted at each tram rear entrance. Conductors were no longer needed and most of them retrained to become motormen.
1986: Tram refurbishment began.
1989: Sharp Street East Depot closed and depot functions split between Whitty Street Depot and Sai Wan Ho Depot.
1992: Two HKT-built double-decker tramcars exported to the Wirral Tramway in Birkenhead, England. Point automation system deployed, and manual point operation abolished.
2000: Coloured destination blinds began. HKT launches new "Millennium" trams designed and manufactured by its own engineering team on 24 October.
2001: Octopus electronic smart card payment system introduced on trams.
2004: HKT celebrates 100 years of service.
2007: Route maps reinstalled at each tram stop. New tram driving panels introduced on 7 November.
2008: Air conditioning installed on antique-style tramcar No. 128.
2009: 50% stake and operating rights obtained by Veolia Transport RATP Asia (now RATP Dev Transdev Asia), followed by full ownership in 2010.
2011: HKT launches seventh-generation trams on 28 November 2011. It has a combination of a modern interior design and a traditional tram body exterior.
2014: HKT celebrates 110 years of service.
2015: Following the opening of the West Island line of the MTR, daily tramway ridership drops 10% to 180,000.
2016: HKT gives real-time estimated time of arrival data to Citymapper, becoming the first transport operator in Hong Kong to do so.
2017: Rebrand with new logo, new livery, and new map.

Ownership
Hong Kong Tramway Electric Company Limited, 1904–1974
The Wharf (Holdings), Limited 1974–2009; retained 50% stake from 2009 to 2010
RATP Dev Transdev Asia, 2010–present

Practical information
Fare – $3.00 (aged 12 or above), $1.5 (children aged 3 to 11), $1.3 (elderly aged 65 or above)
Operating hours – 5:30 am to 12:30 am
Total length –  (Track length )

On average, the headway between each tram departure is approximately 1.5 minutes during peak hours. The maximum capacity of each tram is 115 people. Since early 2008, the speed of the trams was increased. Hong Kong people informally call the tramway the "Ding Ding" and the trams as "Ding Dings", in reference to the double-bell ring used by the trams to warn pedestrians of their approach. Relative to buses and the subway system, trams are often the cheapest public transportation option.

Tickets
As of 31 July 2022, HKT fares are $3.0 for adults, $1.5 for children, and $1.3 for senior citizens. Unlike most forms of public transport in Hong Kong, HKT fares are uniform regardless of the distance travelled. Monthly tickets costing $200 are sold at the Shek Tong Tsui, Causeway Bay, and North Point termini at the end of each month.

Passengers pay upon alighting by either depositing the exact fare in coins into the farebox, or by using an Octopus card. Turnstiles at the tram entrances and closed circuit television prevent fare evasion by passengers.

Tourist services

Sightseeing tours are available on antique-style tramcar No. 68, which has an open balcony and a historical exhibit on board. Sightseeing tram boarding and alighting take place at the sightseeing tour termini: Western Market and Causeway Bay.

Standard tramcars and antique-style, open-balcony tramcars No. 18, No. 28, No. 68, and No. 128 are available for private charter. Charter tram boarding and alighting take place at Whitty Street Depot, except for premium charter tramcar No. 18; its boarding and alighting takes place at Western Market Terminus.

Routes and stops

The trams run on a double-track tram line built parallel to the northern coastline of Hong Kong Island from Kennedy Town to Shau Kei Wan, with a single clockwise-running track of about  around the Happy Valley Racecourse.

There are six overlapping routes:
Kennedy Town ↔ Happy Valley
Kennedy Town ↔ Shau Kei Wan
Shek Tong Tsui ↔ Causeway Bay
Shek Tong Tsui ↔ North Point
Western Market ↔ Shau Kei Wan
Happy Valley ↔ Shau Kei Wan

HKT currently has around 120 tram stops, including its seven termini. The termini, from west to east, are Kennedy Town, Shek Tong Tsui, Western Market, Happy Valley, Causeway Bay, North Point, and Shau Kei Wan. Several tram stops are located in the middle of the road on sheltered refugee islands, which are accessed by pedestrian crossings or footbridges. Track crossovers near the Davis Street, Eastern Street, Pedder Street, Admiralty MTR station, Gresson Street, Victoria Park, North Point Road, and Mount Parker Road stops are used in emergency situations, such as en-route traffic accidents. The majority of HKT stops have remained unchanged since their establishment, but some have had name changes. The Pedder Street stop was previously named Shu Shun Kwun, which referred to a now-demolished former General Post Office building.

Interchanges

The Island line of the MTR is roughly parallel to the tram line between the Kennedy Town and Shau Kei Wan termini. Some sections of MTR tunnels are built directly under roads with tram tracks. Many HKT stops are in close proximity to MTR stations.

Ferry terminals can be accessed from the tram line via footbridges, such as the Hong Kong–Macau Ferry Terminal and the Central Ferry Piers. The latter contains Star Ferry Pier, which is one of the stops for the Star Ferry.

Fleet
HKT has a rare fully double-decker tram fleet. As of 2014, HKT owned 165 double-axle, double-decker trams. There are three maintenance-only trams (No. 200, No. 300, and No. 400) that operate after regular tram service has stopped. The trams are equipped with sliding windows and almost all have full-body advertisements.

Note: Generally, there are no specific/official generation categories on tramcars. Many of the trams in one generation were simply modifications of the previous, such as open-balcony tramcars fitted with canvas roofs and then wooden roofs. The term "generation" should only apply to the new designs.

Service fleet
Mitsubishi Fuso Canter overhead cable maintenance vehicle No. 6016.
Temporary truck stand used for raising tram bodies and frames when trucks are removed for maintenance; it has small wheels that allow it to move around the depot.

Depots

Current depots

Whitty Street Depot in Shek Tong Tsui is the main depot for current operations. It previously operated as a terminus. It has a two-storey workshop, which was responsible for rebuilds in the 1980s.

Sai Wan Ho Depot occupies a site of  leased from the Hong Kong Government on a 5-year renewable tenancy. It lies beneath the Island Eastern Corridor near Shau Kei Wan Road and Hoi Foo Street. It can store 56 tramcars.

Defunct depots
A single, comprehensive depot at Russell Street in Causeway Bay was the only depot of the system in its early days. It was able to house the whole tram fleet (approximately 120 tramcars). By 1932, Russell Street Depot (also known as Causeway Bay Depot) became overcrowded due to an upsurge in the number of trams, prompting HKT to build North Point Depot at King's Road for tram parking purposes (storage for 30 tramcars). Russell Street Depot was later expanded and renamed Sharp Street East Depot. North Point Depot closed in 1951; its former location is now the site of the Healthy Gardens complex. In July 1986, the Executive Council approved the HKT plan to establish new depots at Shek Tong Shui and Sai Wan Ho. HKT claimed that $3.5 million in operating costs would be saved. HKT promised that fares would be unchanged until the end of 1988. The Sharp Street East Depot was decommissioned in 1988 and closed in 1989. The site is now occupied by the Times Square complex.

Projects

Current projects
In 2010, HKT appointed a consultancy firm to investigate the feasibility of constructing a  modern tramway system in the Kai Tak Development, built on the vacated site of the former Kai Tak Airport, in place of the Environmentally Friendly Linkage System monorail proposed by the Hong Kong Government. A proposal was submitted to the Development Bureau on 29 April 2013. HKT pointed out that the cost of constructing the proposed tram system is $2.8 billion, which is less than the $12 billion needed for a monorail system. Possible extensions to neighbouring places such as To Kwa Wan, Kowloon City, and Kwun Tong were suggested. Bruno Charrade, Managing Director of HKT, said that the new system's tramcars could be designed to resemble their Hong Kong Island counterparts or have a totally new design, depending on the government's discretion.

Beginning in 2011, the entire HKT fleet will be refurbished over a period of seven years at a cost of $75 million. The trams will keep their original exterior design, but the outer teak structures will be replaced with aluminium structures. The benches on the lower decks of the trams will be replaced with modern-looking single seats. Digital broadcasts will be placed inside the trams to inform passengers of the next stop, and LED lighting will be installed. AC motors will replace the current DC motors and a new magnetic emergency braking system will be added.

Abandoned projects
During the 1910s, Hong Kong Tramways proposed the Kowloon Tramways Project. However, the completion of KCR Railway caused the Hong Kong Government to veto the plan.

In 1970, Chai Wan on the east side of Hong Kong Island was developed into a residential and industrial area, which greatly increased traffic demand to Central. Extending the tram line from Shau Kei Wan to Chai Wan was considered, but was ultimately rejected. This was due to low cost effectiveness associated with the need to tunnel through the hills between Shau Kei Wan and Chai Wan to maintain level track. The Island line of the MTR was built instead, and its first phase, between Chai Wan and Admiralty, opened on 31 May 1985.

During the development of Tuen Mun New Town in the 1970s, the government reserved space for the construction of a rail transportation system. In 1982, the government invited HKT to construct and operate a tram system in the area. HKT initially expressed interest in the construction of the railway and intended to operate it with double-decker trams, but later withdrew. The government then invited Kowloon-Canton Railway Corporation to construct and operate a light rail system. That system, now known as the Light Rail, opened to the public on 18 September 1988.

April 2017 accident
During the early hours of Thursday, 6 April 2017, a tram tipped over in Central, injuring 14 people. Soon after, it was suggested that the tram was travelling too fast into a turn. The driver was later arrested for allegedly causing grievous bodily harm due to dangerous driving. Two days later, it was reported that HKT suspended a speed monitoring programme intended to discourage drivers from travelling too slowly.

See also
Blackpool Tramway, also uses double-deck trams, but not exclusively
Hong Kong Trams Station
Trams in Alexandria, also uses double-deck trams, but not exclusively
Trams in China
Transport in Hong Kong

References

Further reading
Books

Websites

External links

 
3 ft 6 in gauge railways in Hong Kong
550 V DC railway electrification
Companies formerly listed on the Hong Kong Stock Exchange
Former companies in the Hang Seng Index
Heritage railways in Hong Kong
Hong Kong Island
Railway companies of Hong Kong
RATP Group
Town tramway systems by city
Tram transport in Hong Kong
Tramways with double-decker trams
Transdev
Veolia